The Keith Cabin is a historic house located at 1320 CR 179, northwest of Bonifay in Holmes County, Florida. It was built in 1886.  It was deemed significant "as an excellent and rare example of a 19th century log cabin built with a 'Louisiana' roof. It retains a high level of its architectural integrity, and displays excellent workmanship."

It is a one-story, one-room structure upon a split log pier foundation.  It has verandas around three sides.

It was added to the U.S. National Register of Historic Places on November 2, 2000.

References

External links
  at 
 
 
 

Houses in Holmes County, Florida
Houses on the National Register of Historic Places in Florida
National Register of Historic Places in Holmes County, Florida
Houses completed in 1886